Shafaq Nur Hanim (died 17 March 1884) was the Princess consort of Khedive Isma'il Pasha and was Walida Pasha to their son Tewfik Pasha, the next Khedive of Egypt and Sudan.

Early years
Shafaq Nur Hanim had been a servant in the household of Isma'il's mother Hoshiyar Qadin. When Isma'il was about twenty years old, his mother presented him with Shafaq Nur. He began his sexual activity under the watchful eye of his mother. Shafaq Nur gave birth to his second child, and his first surviving son, Tewfik Pasha, on 30 April 1852 at the Qasr al-Maniyal Palace. Although Isma'il had married the first three princesses ahead of Shafaq Nur, she undoubtedly had high standing in his harem as the mother of his oldest son and as a former member of his mother's household.

She was often referred to in the sources as "Walida" or "Mother". In 1866, fourteen years after Tewfik's birth, Ismail married Shafaq Nur as the Egyptian law required to marry the mother of the heir apparent, and elevated her to the position of the "Fourth Princess". Not long after, she and her son established a separate residence in al-Qubba Palace. She took her due place with the other wives of Ismail Pasha on all state occasions. In Egypt she was known as Deurtundju Hanim or Fourth Lady. She mostly wore traditional Ottoman garments, featuring a few western details.

As Walida Pasha
Isma'il was deposed by the Sultan Abdul Hamid II acting on the advice of the European powers, on 26 June 1879, and his son became the Khedive and Shafaq Nur became the Walida Pasha. Shafak Nur exerted considerable influence on him emerging as his staunch defender as the royal family split on the 'Urabi revolution. Alexander Meyrick Broadley, the British lawyer who defender general 'Urabi, described the way she subjected the princesses of the royal family who supported the leader of the revolution to a tongue lashing for their disloyalty and promising to severely punish them.

Death
Shafaq Nur Hanim died at the Kasr al-'Ali Palace on 17 March 1884, and was buried in the Khedival Mausoleum, Al-Rifa'i Mosque, Cairo.

See also
List of consorts of the Muhammad Ali Dynasty

References

External links

1833 births
1884 deaths
Egyptian concubines
Egyptian people of Turkish descent
Muhammad Ali dynasty
Burials in Egypt
Egyptian royal consorts
Egyptian slaves
19th-century Egyptian women